Club Atlético Valladolid is a Mexican football club that plays in the Tercera División de México. The club is based in Morelia, Michoacán and was founded in 1979.

History
The club was founded for the first time in 1959, to compete in the Second Division, taking advantage of the fact that Club Deportivo Morelia had been promoted to the First Division. In 1962 the team stopped competing professionally for the first time. 

In 1979 the team returned to take part in the professional leagues by enrolling in the Third Division. In 1981 Atlético Valldolid bought the place of Club Atletas Industriales de Querétaro, and with that it returned to the Second Division, taking advantage of the fact that Atlético Morelia was promoted to the First Division. In 1983 the team suffered financial problems and sold its place to C.D. Irapuato, so it was dissolved. 

In 2016 the team was revived by an alliance between a local businessman and a group of former professional footballers, with the aim of turning it into a development team for youth players and seeking a promotion in the future. During its first season the team officially played as Generales de Navojoa because the club got the loan from that franchise to be able to compete. 

In the 2017–2018 season, the team achieved its official registration as a club, so it was able to compete with that name, however, at the end of that period, the team was relocated to Pátzcuaro because it did not get the support of the government and sponsors to allow it to use a stadium in Morelia. 

In 2019 the club was moved to Chiapas due to financial problems, however, after was suspended from Liga TDP. In 2020 the club returned, later, the club merged with the Panteras project, creating a new team called Ates Morelia RC, but using the Atlético Valladolid registry. In 2021 the alliance with Ates Morelia ends and the team returns to compete as Atlético Valladolid, recovering its original owners and entering into an alliance with C.F. La Piedad, because both clubs share the same group of owners.

Players

First-team squad

See also
Football in Mexico
Tercera División de México

External links
Liga TDP

References 

Association football clubs established in 1979
Football clubs in Michoacán
1979 establishments in Mexico